The Roman Catholic Diocese of Angers (Latin: Dioecesis Andegavensis; French: Diocèse d'Angers) is a diocese of the Latin Church of the Roman Catholic Church in France. The episcopal see is located in Angers Cathedral in the city of Angers. The diocese extends over the entire department of Maine-et-Loire.

It was a suffragan see of the Archdiocese of Tours under the old regime as well as under the Concordat. Currently, the diocese is a suffragan of the Archdiocese of Rennes, Dol, and Saint-Malo.

History

The first Bishop known in history is Defensor, who, when present in 372, at the election of the Bishop of Tours, made a determined stand against the nomination of Saint Martin. The legend concerning the earlier episcopate of a certain Auxilius, is connected with the cycle of legends that centre about Saint Firmin of Amiens and is contradicted by Angevin tradition from before the thirteenth century.

Among the illustrious names of the Diocese of Angers during the first centuries of its existence are those of Saint Maurilius, disciple of Saint Martin, and at an earlier period hermit of Chalonnes, who made a vigorous stand against idolatry, and died in 427; Thalassius, consecrated bishop in 453, who has left a compendium of canon law, consisting of the decisions of the councils of the province of Tours; Saint Albinus (sixth century); Saint Licinius, former Count of Anjou, and bishop during the early part of the seventh century.

As for the tradition that Saint Renatus, who had been raised from the dead by Saint Maurilius, was Bishop of Angers for some time shortly before 450, it bases its claims to credibility on a late life of Saint Maurilius written in 905 by the deacon Archinald, and circulated under the name of Gregory of Tours, and it seems to have no real foundation.

Among the Bishops of Angers in modern times were Cardinal de la Balue (1467) confined by Louis XI in an iron cage (1469–1480) for his negotiations with Charles the Bold; the Jansenist, Henri Arnauld (1649–1693); Monsignor Freppel (1870–1891), who had a seat in the Chamber of Deputies, and warmly defended religious interests; Monsignor Mathieu (1893–1896), cardinal of the Curia and member of the French Academy.

Angers Cathedral, a majestic structure without side aisles, dedicated to Saint Maurice, dates from the twelfth century and exhibits the characteristic type of Angevin or Plantagenet architecture. During the Middle Ages Angers was a flourishing monastic city with six great monasteries: the Abbey of St. Aubin founded by King Childebert I; the Abbey of St. Serge by Clovis II; those of St. Julien, St. Nicholas and Ronceray, founded by Count Foulques Nerra, and All Saints' Abbey, an admirable structure of the twelfth century. In 1219 Pope Callixtus II went in person to Angers to assist at the second consecration of the church attached to Ronceray Abbey. The Diocese of Angers includes Fontevrault, an abbey founded at the close of the eleventh century by Robert d'Arbrissel but which did not survive the Revolution. The ruins of St. Maur perpetuate the memory of the great Benedictine abbey of that name.

In 1244, a university was founded at Angers for the teaching of canon and civil law. In 1432 faculties of theology, medicine and art were added. This university was divided into six "nations," and survived up to the time of the Revolution. In consequence of the law of 1875 giving liberty in the matter of higher education, Angers again became the seat of a Catholic university. The Congregation of the Good Shepherd (Bon Pasteur), which has houses in all parts of the world, has its mother-house at Angers by virtue of a papal brief of 1835. Berengarius, the heresiarch condemned for his doctrines on the Holy Eucharist, was Archdeacon of Angers about 1039, and for some time found a protector in the person of Eusebius Bruno, Bishop of Angers. Bernier, who played a great role in the wars of La Vendée and in the negotiations that led to the Concordat, was curé of St. Laud in Angers.

Bishops

To 1000
 Defensor (around 372)
 Maurilius (423–453)
 Thalasse (or Thalaise) (453-462)
 Andulphe (−529)
 Aubin (Albinus) (529–550)
 Audovée (581–592)
 Lezin (592–610)
 Mainboeuf (610–660)
 Dodon (837-880)
 Rainon (881-906)
 Rothard (910)
 Renaud I (920)
 Hervé (929-942)
 Aimon (943-966)?
 Nefingus (966–973)
 Renaud II. (973–1006)

1000 to 1300
 Hubert of Vendôme (1006–1047)
 Eusebius Bruno (1047–1081)
 Gottfried of Tours (1081–1093)
 Gottfried of Mayenne (1093–1101)
 Renaud de Martigné (1102–1125)
 Ulger (1125–1148)
 Normand de Doué (1148–1153)
 Mathieu de Loudun (1156–1162)
 Geoffroy La Mouche (1162–1177)
 Raoul I. de Beaumont (1177–1197)
 Guillaume I. de Chemillé (1197–1202)
 Guillaume II. de Beaumont (1203–1240)
 Michel I. Villoiseau (1240–1260)
 Nicolas Gellent (1260–1291)
 Guillaume III. Le Maire (1291–1317)

1300 to 1500
 Hugues Odard (1317–1323)
 Foulques de Mathefelon (1324–1355)
 Raoul II. de Machecoul (1356–1358)
 Guillaume IV. Turpin de Cressé (1358–1371)
 Milon de Dormans (1371–1373)
 Hardouin de Bueil (1374–1439)
 Jean I. Michel (1439–1447)
 Jean II. de Beauveau (1447–1467)
 Jean de La Balue (1467–1476)
 Jean II de Beauveau (1476–1479) (administrator)
 Auger de Brie (1479–1480) (administrator)
 Jean de La Balue (1480–1491)
 Jean IV. de Rély (1491–1499)
 François de Rohan (1499–1532)

1500 to 1800
 Jean Olivier (1532–1540)
 Gabriel Bouvery (1540–1572)
 Guillaume Ruzé (1572–1587)
 Charles Miron (1588–1616)
 Guillaume Fouquet de la Varenne (1616–1621)
 Charles Miron (1622–1627)
 Claude de Rueil (1628–1649)
 Henri Arnauld (1650–1692)
 Michel Le Peletier (1692–1706)
 Michel Poncet de la Rivière (1706–1730)
 Jean de Vaugirault (1731–1758)
 Jacques de Grasse (1758–1782)
 Michel Cauet (1782–1802)
 Hugues Pelletier (1791–1793)

From 1800
 Charles Montault des Isles (1802–1839)
 Louis-Robert Paysant (1839–1841)
 Guillaume-Laurent-Louis Angebault (1842–1869)
 Charles-Emile Freppel (1869–1891)
 François-Désiré Mathieu (1893–1896) (also Archbishop of Toulouse)
 Louis-Jules Baron (1896–1898)
 Joseph Rumeau (1898–1940)
 Jean-Camille Costes (1940–1950)
 Henri-Alexandre Chappoulie (1950–1959)
 Pierre Veuillot (1959–1961) (also Archbishop of Paris)
 Henri-Louis-Marie Mazerat (1961–1974)
 Jean Pierre Marie Orchampt (1974–2000)
 Jean-Louis Bruguès, O.P. (2000–2007)
 Emmanuel Delmas (since 2008) (fr)

See also
Catholic Church in France
List of Catholic dioceses in France

References

Bibliography

Reference works
  (Use with caution; obsolete)
  (in Latin) 
 (in Latin)

Studies

Matz, Jean-Michel – Comte, François (ed.) (2003): Fasti Ecclesiae Gallicanae. Répertoire prosopographique des évêques, dignitaires et chanoines des diocèses de France de 1200 à 1500. VII. Diocèse d’Angers. Turnhout, Brepols.

External links

 
Roman Catholic dioceses in France

cs:Seznam biskupů v Angers
de:Liste der Bischöfe von Angers
fr:Liste des évêques d'Angers